Ghara is an earthen pot made in India and Pakistan. It is used for storing drinking water and keeping it cool.

The word ghara has cognates in Pahari, Bengali and Odia languages that can all be traced to the Sanskrit word ghaṭa meaning pot.

The word ghara is also used for the hollow bulbous protuberance on the snout of mature male gharials (Gavialis gangeticus) as it is shaped like a ghara.

References

Indian pottery
Pakistani pottery
Bangladeshi pottery